Acontius is a genus of wafer trapdoor spiders that was first described by Ferdinand Karsch in 1879.

Species
 it contains twelve species:
Acontius aculeatus (Simon, 1903) – Equatorial Guinea
Acontius africanus (Simon, 1889) – West Africa, Congo
Acontius australis (Simon, 1886) – Argentina
Acontius hartmanni Karsch, 1879 (type) – Angola
Acontius humiliceps (Simon, 1907) – Equatorial Guinea (Bioko)
Acontius kiriba Zonstein, 2018 – Burundi
Acontius lamottei (Dresco, 1972) – Ivory Coast
Acontius lawrencei (Roewer, 1953) – Congo
Acontius lesserti (Roewer, 1953) – Congo
Acontius machadoi (Lessert, 1938) – Congo
Acontius nimba Zonstein, 2018 – Guinea
Acontius stercoricola (Denis, 1955) – Guinea

References

Cyrtaucheniidae
Mygalomorphae genera
Taxa named by Ferdinand Karsch